My Voice is the debut studio album by South Korean singer Taeyeon. It was released on February 28, 2017, by SM Entertainment and distributed by KT Music. There are two physical editions of the album with similar tracklist but separate covers and booklets. Musically, songs on My Voice are based on Taeyeon's vocals and incorporate various genres including pop, pop rock, and PBR&B. Prior to the release of the album, a music video for "I Got Love" was released on February 18, 2017, as a promotional tool.

The title track and lead single "Fine" was released simultaneously with the album on February 28. To promote My Voice, Taeyeon performed "Fine" on three music programs–Music Bank, Show! Music Core, and Inkigayo from March 3 to 5. The album earned critical and commercial success, peaking atop South Korea's Gaon Album Chart with first-week sales of 109,275 physical copies. On April 5, 2017, a Deluxe edition of My Voice was released. Apart from the original tracks, this edition adds Taeyeon's past hit single "11:11", and three new songs including the single "Make Me Love You".

Background and release 
Since debuting as a soloist in October 2015 with the successful extended plays I and Why as well as chart-topping digital singles "Rain" and "11:11", South Korean singer Kim Tae-yeon (known by her mononym Taeyeon) has risen to prominence and established herself as the country's most popular individual celebrity of 2016. On February 14, 2017, Taeyeon's agency SM Entertainment announced that her first full-length studio album would be released in the end of February. A day later, the agency released promotional photos and a short trailer of the music video for a new song titled "I Got Love", which was set to be the album's pre-released track. On February 20, 2017, the album's title was revealed to be My Voice, with the title track being "Fine".

Promotion 
Prior to the release of the album, a series of "highlight videos" featuring snippets of the album's tracks were released by SM Entertainment through several channels including Naver and YouTube. Promotion schedule for the album started on March 3, 2017, with a performance on Music Bank, followed by performances on Show! Music Core and Inkigayo.

On March 29, 2017, it was announced that a deluxe edition of the album would be released on April 5, 2017. The tracklist incorporates three newly recorded songs and Taeyeon's previous digital single "11:11". The title track and lead single off the deluxe edition was titled "Make Me Love You".

To further promote the album, Taeyeon embarked on a concert tour titled "Persona", kicking off on May 12, 2017, at the Seoul Olympic Park. The tour subsequently visited Hong Kong, Taipei and Bangkok.

Composition 
The digital edition of My Voice contains 12 songs, while the physical release includes 13 tracks with a bonus titled "Time Spent Walking Through Memories", which is a cover of South Korean indie rock band Nell. There are two versions of the physical edition–"Fine" and "I Got Love" versions with different covers and booklets.

The album incorporates various genres that are "based on Taeyeon's unique vocals", including pop, R&B, and PBR&B. Tamar Herman from Billboard detailed the album as an emphasis on pop rock and R&B. The title track "Fine" was revealed to be an alternative pop song. Meanwhile, "Sweet Love" is a pop and R&B song and "I'm OK" draws influences from jazz. "Cover Up" is a tropical house number instrumented by musical keyboard and string instruments, while "Love in Color" is an acoustic piano ballad that highlights Taeyeon's vocals.

Three new original songs featured on the deluxe edition are "Make Me Love You", "I Blame on You" and "Curtain Call". "Make Me Love You" is a soulful pop and R&B song, while "I Blame on You" is a pop ballad, and "Curtain Call" is a pop rock number.

Reception 

Upon reviewing My Voice for South Korean music portal IZM, Hyun Min-young was impressed towards the album's "Westernized" and experimental musical styles including tropical house, R&B, and swing. He additionally lauded Taeyeon's "impressive" vocals on the album, which was exemplified by the refrain of the track "Sweet Love". However, he did not favor the album's songwriting, commenting that "the music by overseas producers [...] are not compatible with the lyrics of the songs, [...] causing disproportion between the melody and the lyrics". The Stars Chester Chin also praised Taeyeon's "impressive" vocal performance, deeming it as "the star of the show". While considering the album's musical styles as a lack of "cohesiveness" due to its incorporation of multiple genres, Chin argued that My Voice was a "monumental record" as it focused more on Taeyeon's artistry rather than K-pop's common emphasis on "slick boot-camp choreography, powerful visuals and a highly manufactured sound".

My Voice was an instant commercial success in South Korea; prior to its release, the album's pre-order sales exceeded 114,000 physical copies, which set a record for a female soloist in terms of highest pre-order album sales. It debuted atop the Gaon Album Chart and was the third best-selling album of February 2017 in South Korea with sales of 109,275 copies. As of April 2017, it has sold over 142,894 units in South Korea. In Japan, the album debuted at number thirty-nine on the Oricon Albums Chart and has sold over 5,000 copies as of April 2017. My Voice debuted at number two the Billboard World Albums, becoming Taeyeon's second number-two entry on the chart following Why (2016). It additionally charted at number 19 on the Top Heatseekers. In conjunction with the commercial performance of the album in the United States, Taeyeon was subject to increasing interest on social platforms, appearing at number 31 of the Social 50 chart for the week of March 8, 2017.

On June 27, Fuse released its list of “The 20 Best Albums of 2017 So Far,” and Taeyeon's “My Voice” came in No. 17. It is the only Korean release to make the list. Later, Billboard listed the album at number 15 in "20 Best K-Pop Albums 2017", praising the album's reflective, nostalgia-tinged pop album that explores the singer's titular voice through a variety of genres. Plus, they wrote "My Voice is playful at times and evocative at others as it flits through musical styles, but throughout the listening experience, it is Taeyeon’s crisp vocals that are front and center."

Accolades

Track listing

Personnel 
Credits are adapted from the liner notes of My Voice.
 S.M. Entertainment Co., Ltd. – executive producer
 Lee Soo-man – producer
 Taeyeon – vocals

Charts

Weekly charts

Monthly charts

Year-end chart

Sales

Release history

See also 
 List of Gaon Album Chart number ones of 2017

References 

2017 debut albums
Korean-language albums
SM Entertainment albums
Taeyeon albums
Pop albums by South Korean artists